Nilgün Belgün (born 18 March 1953) is a Turkish actress.

Life and career 
Belgün studied at the Special Şişli High School and later at the Istanbul Municipal Conservatory. She started her career in 1973. She first went on stage at Devekuşu Cabaret's theatre, and then worked as a stage actress in various locations. After appearing in a number of TV series and movies, her breakthrough came in 1990 with her role in Bir Başka Gece. Aside from her acting career, she made various types of parodies at entertainment shows on TV. She also authored books and worked for the awareness campaign of Turkey Menopause and Osteoporosis Society. She then presented programs on Star TV and TV8.

Filmography 

 Jet Sosyete (2019 / 2020) - Olcay Sahici (episodes 30 and 59)
 Akasya Durağı - 2009–2012
 Papatyam - 2011
 Petek Dinçözle 10 Numara - 2010
 Karışık Aile - 2010
 Benim Annem Bir Melek - 2008
 Yağmurdan Sonra - 2008
 Çinliler Geliyor - 2006 
 Yalancı Yarim - 2006 
 Mavi Kolye - 2004 
 3. Tür - 2004 
 Tatil Aşkları - 2004 
 Yabancı Damat - 2004 
 Beybaba / Koltuk - 2003 
 Büyümüş de Küçülmüş - 2003 
 Şeytan Bunun Neresinde - 2002 
 Şen Kahkahalar - 2001 
 Güz Gülleri - 2001 
 Bana Şans Dile - 2001 
 Bir Demet Kahkaha - 2000 
 Adada Bir Sonbahar - 2000 
 Baykuşların Saltanatı - 2000 
 Kadınlar Kulübü - 1999 
 Hayvanlara Dokunduk - 1997 
 Köşe Kapmaca - 1996 
 Çiçek Taksi - 1995 
 Cümbüş Sokak - 1993 
 Bizim Mahalle - 1993 
 Bıçkın - 1988

Books 
 İçimdeki Kadın, Filika Publication
 Bir Kadın Bir Erkek, Filika Publication (with Cengiz Özakıncı)
 Hayat... Sen Benimsin, Doğan Egmont Publication

References

External links 
 
 

1953 births
Turkish stage actresses
Turkish film actresses
Turkish television actresses
Actresses from Istanbul
Living people